Vijayray Kalyanray Vaidya was a Gujarati critic, biographer and essayist. After studying languages, he was engaged in Gujarati literary journalism and later criticism. He edited several magazines and wrote works of criticism, biography and essays.

Biography
Vijayray Vaidya was born on 7 April 1897 in Bhavnagar. He completed B. A. in English and Sanskrit from Wilson College, Bombay in 1920. He served as a cashier in Sir Lallubhai Shamaldas Bank, Bombay from 1920 to 1921. He joined Gujarati periodical, Chetna. He served as an editor of Hindustan Weekly of Bombay and a subeditor of daily from 1921 to 1922. On invitation of K. M. Munshi, he served as an in-charge editor of Gujarat. He served with Sahitya Sansad from 1922 to 1924. He started Kaumudi, a quarterly and later a monthly. After it was stopped, he started Manasi in 1935. He taught Gujarati at M.T.B. College, Surat from 1937 to 1949 or 1952 along with editing Manasi. Manasi was published till 1960 with some breaks. He presided over the criticism department of Gujarati Sahitya Parishad in Surat in 1965. He was a founder member of All India P.E.N. Centre. He edited Rohini in last period of life but had little success.

He died on 17 April 1974.

Works
He had long career of literary journalism and criticism. His Sahityadarshan (1935) is about theory of literary criticism and Jui ane Ketaki (1939) is about applied criticism. Nhanalal Kavini Jivandrishti is a criticism of works of Nanalal Dalpatram Kavi. Gatashatak nu Sahitya (1959) is about the first hundred years of the modern Gujarati literature. Leela Suka Pana (1942) had research articles. Parasna Sparshe (1963), Neelam Ane Pokhraj (1962) and Manek Ane Akik (1967) are the collections of criticism. Gujarati Sahityani Rooprekha (1943) is about history of Gujarati literature.

He wrote essays under pen name Vinodkant. His collections of essays are Prabhatna Rang (1927), Najuk Savari (1938), Udata Pan (1945), Dariyavni Mithi Lahar (1965). His Khuski Ane Tari (1933) is a travelogue of his visit to Karachi and Rangoon.

Sukratarak (1944) is a biography of Navalram Pandya. Saurashtrano Mantrishwar (1959) is a biography of Gaurishankar Udayshankar Oza, the dewan of Bhavnagar State. Vinayakni Atmakatha (1970) is an autobiographical work.

During later years of his life, he started enormous task of compiling an encyclopedia of world literature single handed. He could publish only first volume of his work, Sahitya Priyano Sathi (1967).

Awards
He was awarded Ranjitram Suvarna Chandrak in 1931 and Narmad Suvarna Chandrak in 1955.

References

External links
 
 

Indian literary critics
Writers from Gujarat
Gujarati-language writers
People from Bhavnagar district
Indian male journalists
20th-century Indian biographers
1897 births
1974 deaths
Indian editors
Indian male essayists
20th-century Indian essayists
20th-century Indian journalists
Recipients of the Ranjitram Suvarna Chandrak
20th-century Indian male writers
Male biographers